Hernán Rodrigo Elizondo González (born July 3, 1976, in Monterrey, Nuevo León) is a Mexican former football player.

References

External links
 

1976 births
Living people
Association football defenders
Atlante F.C. footballers
Correcaminos UAT footballers
Club Celaya footballers
Liga MX players
Ascenso MX players
Mexican football managers
Footballers from Nuevo León
Sportspeople from Monterrey
Mexican footballers